Edi M. Shukriu (born 1950) is a Kosovar political figure, archaeologist, and writer.

Biography
A native of Prizren, Shukriu received a master's degree in archaeology from the University of Belgrade in 1972; in October 1990 she finished her doctorate in the same discipline at the University of Pristina. First employed by the Kosovo Museum, she then taught archaeology in Pristina. In 1989 she joined the Democratic League of Kosovo, in whose foreign relations she took a role. From 1995 until 2000 she chaired its women's forum, and she was also a member of the Assembly of the Republic of Kosovo for the party. Shukriu has written a number of verse collections and plays, as well as several non-fiction works. Among the first Kosovar women to publish poetry in Albanian, she graduated from the Iowa Writers' Workshop in 2005. She has continued to teach archaeology and ancient history at the University of Pristina.

References

1950 births
Living people
Kosovan women writers
Kosovan poets
Kosovan women poets
Kosovan dramatists and playwrights
Women dramatists and playwrights
Kosovan archaeologists
Kosovan women archaeologists
Kosovan non-fiction writers
Women non-fiction writers
20th-century Serbian poets
20th-century dramatists and playwrights
20th-century archaeologists
20th-century non-fiction writers
20th-century women writers
21st-century poets
21st-century dramatists and playwrights
21st-century archaeologists
21st-century non-fiction writers
21st-century women writers
Kosovan women in politics
Members of the Assembly of the Republic of Kosovo
Democratic League of Kosovo politicians
20th-century women politicians
21st-century women politicians
People from Prizren
University of Belgrade alumni
University of Pristina alumni
Iowa Writers' Workshop alumni
Academic staff of the University of Pristina
Members of the Academy of Sciences and Arts of Kosovo